Marine Boy was one of the first color anime cartoons to be shown in a dubbed form in the U.S., and later in Australia and the United Kingdom. It was sold outside Japan via K. Fujita Associates Inc., with Warner Bros.-Seven Arts Television handling worldwide distribution of the English-language version. The series was distributed in syndication in the United States starting in 1966.

Series
The show revolves around a talented boy who is further enhanced by some sophisticated inventions.  With these, he serves with the underwater policing agency, the Ocean Patrol, in making Earth's oceans safe.

The series is set in the future, when humankind has explored the world's oceans, establishing great facilities for undersea ranching (episode 4, 17, 22), mineral and oil exploitation (ep. 2, 12), research (ep. 6, 7), and some underocean communities (ep. 10, 15).

In this era there is an ocean-based government agency: The Ocean Patrol, whose mission includes protecting all in the sea from danger (episode 4). Most of the activity we witness of the OP is that of policing the world's oceans, for this affluent frontier and its resources seems to have produced a startling number of megalomaniacs—it seems hardly a week goes by in which the Ocean Patrol doesn't divert someone with an impressive private military force from taking over the world. That being the case, the Ocean Patrol is also an impressive military force with small and large subs, war ships, and an air force (ep. 5, 18).  The military branch of the OP includes researchers and scientists who are constantly developing their defensive and offensive arsenal (ep. 9, 10, 17, 19) as well as new research vehicles (ep. 10, 12) and devices (ep. 13). Key people in this department are Marine Boy's father, Dr. Mariner, as well as the brilliant Professor Fumble. However, there are non-military branches of the Ocean Patrol which conduct some of the aforementioned ranching, research, oil drilling and so on.

The series follows the Ocean Patrol's patrol boat P-1. The patrol boats are small submarine craft, comfortably sized to be crewed by 3 or 4 people. They are also capable of flight for limited times using retractable wings (episode 4, 27). Patrol boats may be heavily armed, most commonly with small "rocket torpedoes," but optional weaponry is sometimes mounted. These have included a heat beam, boxing glove missiles (ep. 4), smoke screen (ep. 4, 14), a heavy saw, sonic cannon (ep. 9), a steel net (ep. 11), power claws, drill and laser beam guns (ep. 28).  The crew of the P-1 includes Bolton and Piper (a double act, reminiscent of Laurel and Hardy) and often the Ocean Patrol member Marine Boy.

Marine Boy is an extremely intelligent, strong and athletic boy of perhaps 13 to 15 years of age.  He is a martial artist (episode 1, 2, 8, 16), football player (ep. 17), and an accomplished pilot (ep. 10) whose talents are further enhanced by the inventions of his father, Dr. Mariner. He has a great affinity with sea life, most particularly with a white dolphin he calls Splasher who Marine Boy occasionally seems able to communicate with quite clearly (ep. 11, 12, 17, 28). (MB also wears a ring with a dolphin-calling whistle in it (ep. 2, 4, 16).) It is perhaps because of his skills along with  his avid insistence to get involved with trouble that his father, along with Professor Fumble, invented for him the red wetsuit which protects and equips Marine Boy, allowing for him to use his talents to perform dangerous duty. With his headstrong personality, he hardly seems able to avoid it.

The suit is highly resistant to penetration (ep. 1, 2) (it appears it may be bulletproof) and temperature (ep. 17, 21). The boots have hyper-powered propeller packs built into the heels which are so efficient they can enable Marine Boy to move huge boulders (ep. 3) and break free from metal manacles (ep. 10). When the power units are exhausted Marine Boy has spares in his belt. He also has retractable flippers, released at the click of his heels (ep. 3). The headgear includes a radio transceiver, but most remarkably, there is no breathing apparatus or face shield.  Oxygen is supplied through another of Professor Fumble's inventions: "oxy-gum" which Marine Boy can chew and receive hours of oxygenation. He tends to have to replenish the gum after heavy activity.  Presumably the oxy-gum is very limited in production because no other Ocean Patrol officers use it. Marine Boy also carries a weapon: a boomerang made of a hardened alloy. The alloy can cut through many materials and the nimble Marine Boy has even used it to deflect bullets (ep. 24). It folds on a spring so it can be carried in a holster on his left arm. When unfolded and thrown it can generate a powerful electric shock, which has proved to be so disruptive to some electrical systems, it has blown up entire submarines (ep. 14, 16, 28).

Marine Boy also has a friend in Neptina, a young (8-12-year-old?) bare-chested mermaid who was always kept decent by her long flowing hair.  Neptina wears a magic pearl around her neck, which could be used for various purposes including creating an envelope of protection and deterring dangerous animals (episode 1, 2, 17), as well as working as a crystal ball to see events (ep. 3, 6, 13, 15, 16, 17). She also seems to understand Splasher (ep. 3, 6, 10) and have an innate understanding of sea life (ep. 4).  During battle Marine Boy always directs her to safely stay out of harm's way, and Neptina always submits, then almost inevitably ends up saving Marine Boy. However, in spite of all his gadgets, Marine Boy is knocked out several times by the villains. Marine Boy often faints after being attacked with knock-out gas but Marine Boy is also knocked unconscious by robot spiders, red dolphins and mysterious seaweed, to name but a few. He is also frequently kidnapped by the villains but usually rescued by his friends.

History
The program concept was developed by Terebi Doga, (a.k.a. Produced as a short experimental trial series of only three episodes and filmed in black and white, Dolphin Prince aired on Fuji TV on Sundays at 7:30 pm between 4 April and 18 April 1965. The episodes featured young Dolphin Prince, his mermaid friend Neptuna and Dr. Mariner, with stories entitled "Secret Of The Red Vortex", "Call Of The Sea" and "Attack Of The Sea-Star People". It was a well-received experiment and Terebi Doga prepared to produce a full series follow-up, although this time they decided that their program would be produced in color in order to maximise the potential of the production, both artistically and commercially.

Japan had been transmitting some programs in color since 1960, however, not all Japanese studios had converted their operations to color. To complicate matters, not all Japanese networks were interested in buying expensive color film series which were considered vehicles for selling commercial airtime, especially programs aimed primarily at children. Some broadcasters (such as NHK, TBS, NET and Yomiuri Telecasting Corporation) had embraced color as the emerging and more engaging format, but others such as Fuji TV were unwilling to buy or co-finance color programming without a guarantee of commercial return or sponsored support. Fuji TV had broadcast the popular color series Jungle Emperor in 1965, but this would not have been filmed in color at all without the pre-sale of the series to U.S. distributor NBC Films for broadcast in the United States as Kimba the White Lion (on the NBC Network which, at the time, insisted that it be supplied color programming by its distributors, the network using color as a promotional tool to attract both sponsors and viewers alike).

Terebi Doga, wishing to further explore their Dolphin Prince concept via a full color version, returned to Fuji TV, expecting that the network would happily buy an expanded version of their original monochrome pilot series. Fuji, however, declined to buy into the project, happy as they were with the ratings they were achieving with their current Thursday night black and white anime series Harris' Whirlwind. Undeterred, Terebi Doga found external sponsorship from the Matsushita Electric Industrial Company (later to be known as Panasonic), and sold their new version of Dolphin Prince to rival TBS Network. Character names were altered, (changing 'Dolphin Prince' to 'Marine Kid' and 'Neptuna' to 'Neptina'), characters were added and concepts expanded. In order to  distance the new series from the original trial episodes, the series was re-titled  and aired on Thursdays at 7:00 pm between 6 October and 29 December 1966. Despite Toei Doga's high hopes, the scheduling of Hang On! Marine Kid was a ratings disaster for TBS, slotted as it was directly in opposition to the ever-popular Harris' Whirlwind, which was still airing on Fuji TV at 7:00 pm. Hang On! Marine Kid was cancelled after its first batch of 13 episodes and not renewed.

Despite its cancellation, Hang On! Marine Kid was promoted for sale by Japanese program seller K. Fujita, who in turn attracted the attention of producer Stanley R. Jaffe representing U.S. distributor Seven Arts Television, which later merged into Warner Bros./Seven Arts. Jaffe expressed interest in re-packaging the existing series and expanding it with newly animated episodes for the English-speaking market, with two provisions. First, the series needed to run for 78 episodes to ensure the program had substantial shelf-life and value for money for stations buying it. Second, it was stipulated that the Japanese-language version could not be aired in Japan before the English-language version had aired first-run in the U.S. and sold to international broadcasters. With the deal agreed to, Terebi Doga launched production again, preparing the elements of both Dolphin Prince, (the three monochrome episodes re-worked and re-shot in color), and the 13 completed episodes of Hang On! Marine Kid for use in the new series, as well as gearing up to producing 62 more new episodes as required to produce the complete 78-episode run. Scripts and storyboards were prepared in both English and Japanese and with a fast turnaround in the production process, the episodes were delivered to Zavala-Riss Productions in the U.S. for English dubbing (the unit that also dubbed Speed Racer, featuring the same voice actor cast).

By the end of production, two distinct versions had been produced:
- one for the U.S. and foreign markets which would be known as Marine Boy

As per the terms of the agreement, Marine Boy was first run as a syndicated program throughout the U.S. and in international markets from late 1967 onwards. The Japanese version of the series was eventually sold to Fuji TV and aired on Mondays at 6 pm between 31 January 1969 and 22 September 1969, with only the first 36 episodes broadcast. It was later bought by Nippon TV, all 78 episodes airing Monday to Friday at 5:00 pm between 11 May to 2 September 1971.

English characterization
The voice of Marine Boy, Neptina and Clicli  was that of Corinne Orr, who was also the voice of Trixie and Spritle in Speed Racer. Jack Grimes, who also worked on Speed Racer, was the voice of Professor Fumble and Splasher. Peter Fernandez was the voice of Piper and Dr. Mariner. His other work includes The Space Giants, Ultraman,  Star Blazers, many of the Godzilla films, as well as both Speed and Racer X from Speed Racer. Jack Curtis was the voice of Bullton, as well as the series' narrator (performing the same duties on Speed Racer).

Episode guide
Warner Bros.' 2009 syndication order

Home video release
The series has been restored and remastered from original elements for DVD release by the Warner Archive Collection. Season 1 was released on June 18, 2013, followed by Season 2 on February 11, 2014.  Season 3 was released on July 2, 2014.

References

External links
 
 
 Little Gems, dedicated to the Little Gems of children's television programs
 Classic Anime appreciation site - contains episode guides, photos, casts, etc.
 60's Anime site in Australia
 GO! 2009-2010 Australian broadcast schedule

1965 anime television series debuts
1966 anime television series debuts
1969 anime television series debuts
Japanese children's animated action television series
Japanese children's animated adventure television series
Japanese children's animated science fantasy television series
Japanese children's animated superhero television series
Adventure anime and manga
Fictional undersea characters
Fuji TV original programming
Science fiction anime and manga
Submarines in fiction
Television series by Warner Bros. Television Studios